Hyuk, also spelled Hyok or Hyeok, is a unisex Korean given name, as well as an element in some two-syllable Korean given names. The meaning differs based on the hanja used to write the name.

Hanja and meaning
In South Korea, the Supreme Court's Regulations on Registration of Family Relations require that hanja registered for use in given names be either Basic Hanja for educational use or appear in the Table of Hanja for Personal Name Use. There is one hanja with the reading  among the Basic Hanja for educational use:

: "leather"

Additionally, the Table of Hanja for Personal Name Use contains eleven hanja with the reading  (including one which is a variant form of another hanja in the table):

: "tranquil"
: "to threaten"
: "abundant"
: "the game of Go" 
: "ditch"
: "shining"
: "flames"
 "shining"
 (variant)
: "to argue"
: "dark red"

People
People with this name include:
Byun Hyuk (born 1966), South Korean film director and screenwriter
An Hyuk (born 1968), North Korean defector who escaped from the Yodok concentration camp
Kim Hyuk (born 1972), South Korean judo practitioner
Jang Hyuk (born 1976), South Korean actor
Kwon Hyuk (born 1983), South Korean baseball player
Kim Hyuk (footballer) (born 1985), South Korean football player
Hyuk Shin (born 1985), South Korean-born American music producer
Jeong Hyuk (born 1986), South Korean football player
Dean (South Korean singer) (born Kwon Hyuk, 1992), South Korean singer-songwriter and record producer
Oh Hyuk (born 1993), South Korean singer, member of Hyukoh
Jin Hyuk, South Korean television director

People with the stage name or nickname Hyuk include:
Im Hyuk (born Im Jung-hyuk, 1949), South Korean actor
Hyuk (singer) (born Han Sang-hyuk, 1995), South Korean singer, member of VIXX

As name element
Given names containing this element include:

Dong-hyuk
Jae-hyuk
Jin-hyuk
Jong-hyuk
Joon-hyuk
Kwang-hyok
Min-hyuk

See also
List of Korean given names

References

Korean masculine given names